Tom Freebairn (born 3 February 1995) is an Australian professional rugby league footballer who plays as a  and  forward.

He previously played for the Wests Tigers in the NRL.

Background
Freebairn was born in Ipswich and previously played for and captained the North Sydney Bears in the NSW Cup. Freebairn also made appearances for the Sydney Roosters in the 2020 NRL Nines.

Career

2022
Freebairn made his debut in Round 21 of the 2022 NRL season for the Tigers against the Newcastle Knights.
In round 24, Freebairn scored two tries for the Wests Tigers in a 24-22 loss against St. George Illawarra.
In October, Freebairn was named as Western Suburbs NSW Cup player of the season.

References

1995 births
Living people
Australian rugby league players
Wests Tigers players
Western Suburbs Magpies NSW Cup players
Rugby league locks